Jacob Philip (Jaap) van Praag (born 11 May 1911 in Amsterdam – died 12 April 1981 in Utrecht) was a Dutch humanist who played a prominent role in establishing the Dutch Humanist League. He was its chairman from 1946 to 1969. And, from 1954 to 1974, he was a member of a provincial Executive.

Van Praag was one of the first professors in Humanist studies in University of Leiden (1964–1979). He played a major role in the founding of the International Humanist and Ethical Union and was its chairman from inception in 1952 until 1975.

Name confusion 
There is another Jaap van Praag, his namesake, a football administrator and former chairman of local football club Ajax Amsterdam with whom he is often confused. Both were around the same age (born 1911 and 1910), both born in Amsterdam and both survived the war hiding in the city. In addition both played a role in broadcasting for the VARA.

Sources
Biography by Pieter Edelman in the Encyclopedie van het Humanisme (in Dutch).

1911 births
1981 deaths
People from Amsterdam
Dutch humanists
Dutch corporate directors
Dutch Jews
Jewish Dutch politicians
Humanistic Jews
Jewish socialists
Dutch nonprofit executives
Labour Party (Netherlands) politicians
Social Democratic Workers' Party (Netherlands) politicians
Members of the Provincial-Executive of South Holland
Businesspeople from Amsterdam
Academic staff of Leiden University